Events from the year 1897 in Italy

Kingdom of Italy
Monarch – Umberto I (1878–1900)
Prime Minister – Antonio di Rudinì (1896–1898)

Events

In 1897 the wheat harvest in Italy was substantially lower than the years before; it fell from on average 3.5 million tons in 1891–95 to 2.4 million tons that year. Increasing wheat prices caused social unrest.

February
 February 2 – Despite the guarantees given by the Great Powers on the Ottoman sovereignty over Crete, Colonel Timoleon Vassos unilaterally proclaimed the union of the island with Greece. The Powers reacted by demanding that the Greek Prime Minister Theodoros Deligiannis immediately withdraw Greek forces from the island in exchange for a statute of autonomy. The demand was rejected, and on 7 February the first full-scale battle between Greeks and Turks occurred, when the Greek expeditionary force in Crete defeated a 4,000-strong Ottoman force at the Battle of Livadeia, Crete. The bold action of the Greeks excites popular admiration in Italy and sympathy with the Cretan Christians.
 February 17 – Vice Admiral Felice Napoleone Canevaro, commanding the Italian warships in Cretan waters, is chosen to command the combined naval forces of the Great Powers, as the senior admiral of the united fleet, known as the International Squadron. He warns Greece and Cretan insurgents to cease all hostile actions against the Turks.
 February 21 – Popular manifestations in Rome and other towns in Italy in favour of the union of Greece and Crete, which is under Ottoman rule.

March
 March 21 – First round of the Italian general election.
 March 28 – Second round of the Italian general election, 1897. The "Ministerial" left-wing bloc, led by Giovanni Giolitti remained the largest in Parliament, winning 327 of the 508 seats.

April
 April 5 – May 8 – Greco-Turkish War over the status of the Ottoman province of Crete, whose Greek majority long desired union with Greece. Italian volunteers under the command of Ricciotti Garibaldi go to Crete to fight for the unification of Crete with Greece. Greece will suffer a heavy defeat and the Great Powers will force the Greek army to abandon the island.
 April 12 – After four days of debate Prime Minister Antonio di Rudinì survives a vote of confidence over the policy towards Greece in relation with the Cretan State.
 April 22 – King Umberto I is attacked by an unemployed anarchist ironsmith, Pietro Acciarito, who tried to stab him near Rome.

May
 May 16 –  The Teatro Massimo in Palermo, Sicily, the third largest opera house—after the Palais Garnier in Paris and the K. K. Hof-Opernhaus in Vienna—was inaugurated with a performance of Verdi's Falstaff conducted by Leopoldo Mugnone.

December
 December 5 – Minister of War, General Luigi Pelloux, resigns over a conflict about army promotions. Prime Minister Di Rudini is tasked with forming a new Cabinet. The previous one was riddled with irreconcilable positions, Di Rudini now tries to form a more unified government.
 December 14 – Prime Minister Di Rudini forms a new Cabinet, which includes the Liberal Giuseppe Zanardelli as Minister of Justice.

Sports
April 10 – James Richardson Spensley opened the footballing section for the Genoa Cricket & Athletics Club, a cricket and athletics club formed by British expatriates, and was put in place as its first ever manager.
November 1 – Juventus F.C. founded as Sport-Club Juventus by a group of young students from Turin.

Births
 February 27 – Edmond Amateis, sculptor (died 1981)
 June 15 – Carlo Scorza, Fascist leader (died 1988) 
 December 19 – Vasco Ronchi, physicist (died 1988)

Deaths
 February 7 – Galileo Ferraris, physicist (born 1847)
 March 10 – Teodulo Mabellini, composer (born 1817)
 March 16 – Bernardino Grimaldi, Italian politician (b. 1837)
 March 27 – Paolo Angelo Ballerini, prelate (born 1814)
 August 20 – Michele Angiolillo, anarchist (born 1871)
 December 13 – Francesco Brioschi, mathematician (born 1825).

References

 Clark, Martin (1984/2014). Modern Italy, 1871 to the Present, New York: Routledge, 

 
Years of the 19th century in Italy
Italy